Uqayrabah (also spelled Okeirbeh or Iqerba) is a Syrian village located in the Jubb Ramlah Subdistrict of the Masyaf District in Hama Governorate. According to the Syria Central Bureau of Statistics (CBS), Uqayrabah had a population of 1,515 in the 2004 census.

References

Populated places in Masyaf District